Richland Township is one of the fourteen townships of Holmes County, Ohio, United States. As of the 2010 census the population was 1,284, up from 1,165 at the 2000 census. In 2010, 1,012 of the population lived in the unincorporated portion of the township.

Geography
Located in the southwestern corner of the county, it borders the following townships:
Knox Township - north
Monroe Township - northeast
Killbuck Township - east
Monroe Township, Coshocton County - southeast
Tiverton Township, Coshocton County - south
Union Township, Knox County - southwest
Jefferson Township, Knox County - northwest

The village of Glenmont is located in northern Richland Township.

Name and history
It is one of twelve Richland Townships statewide.

Government
The township is governed by a three-member board of trustees, who are elected in November of odd-numbered years to a four-year term beginning on the following January 1. Two are elected in the year after the presidential election and one is elected in the year before it. There is also an elected township fiscal officer, who serves a four-year term beginning on April 1 of the year after the election, which is held in November of the year before the presidential election. Vacancies in the fiscal officership or on the board of trustees are filled by the remaining trustees.

References

External links
County website

Townships in Holmes County, Ohio
Townships in Ohio